Jack Clarke may refer to:

Jack Clarke (athlete) (fl. 1945–1952), New Zealand marathon runner
Jack Clarke (footballer, born 1931) (1931–1997), Australian rules footballer and Essendon player
Jack Clarke (footballer, born 1933) (1933–2001), Australian rules footballer and East Fremantle player
Jack Clarke (footballer, born 2000), English footballer
Jack Clarke (racing driver) (born 1988), racing driver in the FIA Formula Two Championship
Jack Clarke (rugby union) (born 1968), Irish rugby union player
Jack Clarke (mountaineer) (1875–1952), New Zealand mountaineer, first ascendant of Mounts Cook, Tasman and Aspiring

See also
Jack Clark (disambiguation)
John Clarke (disambiguation)
Jackie Clarke (born 1966), New Zealand entertainer
Jackie Clarke (footballer) (born 1949), Irish soccer player